Barbaros Barut (born 26 January 1983 in Munich) is a Turkish-German football midfielder who currently plays for Manisaspor.

References

External links
 Barbaros Barut at tff.org 
 Barbaros Barut at kicker.de 
 Mackolik Profile

1983 births
Living people
Footballers from Munich
German footballers
German people of Turkish descent
FC Bayern Munich II players
SpVgg Unterhaching players
SpVgg Greuther Fürth players
Rot-Weiss Essen players
MKE Ankaragücü footballers
Kasımpaşa S.K. footballers
Adanaspor footballers
2. Bundesliga players
TFF First League players

Association football midfielders